Gene Ficken (born 1944) is a Democratic politician, representing the 23rd District in the Iowa House of Representatives since 2008.

Ficken is a retired teacher from Independence Community Schools and a small business owner.

He is a member of the Jaycees and Kiwanis.

Committee membership
 Education Committee, Iowa House of Representatives (Vice Chair)
 Natural Resources Committee, Iowa House of Representatives
 Subcommittee on Education Appropriations
 Veterans Affairs Committee, Iowa House of Representatives

Election

2008
On November 4, 2008, Ficken was elected to the 23rd District Seat in the Iowa House of Representatives, defeating Dan Rasmussen (R).  Ficken raised $317,415 for his campaign, while Rasmussen raised $230,231.

2010
Iowa House of Representatives District 23 General Election  Unofficial Iowa Election Results
Gene Ficken (D) (5381 votes) (49.02%)
Dan Rasmussen (R) (5587 votes) (50.90%)
write in (9 votes) (0.08%)

References

External links
Representative Gene Ficken official Iowa General Assembly site
Gene Ficken State Representative official constituency site
Gene Ficken State Representative official campaign site
 

Democratic Party members of the Iowa House of Representatives
Living people
University of Northern Iowa alumni
Place of birth missing (living people)
1944 births